Rick DellaRatta is an American jazz singer and pianist.

Career
The oldest of five children, DellaRatta studied at the New England Conservatory, earning a bachelor's degree in Piano Performance and a master's degree in Jazz Composition. He studied jazz piano with Jackie Byard, Kenny Werner, Charlie Banacos, and Richie Bierach and classical piano with Thomas Stumpf.

In 1997 Rick DellaRatta with Eddie Gomez, Dave Liebman, and Lenny White released the album Thought Provoking. In 2000 he was nominated for a MAC award for Recording of the Year

Discography
 Take It or Leave It (Stella, 1995)
 Thought Provoking (Origin, 1997)
 Live in Brazil and the Blue Note (Origin, 1998)
 Alone Together (Origin, 2000)
 Jazz at Christmas Time (Origin, 2001)

References

External links
Official site

1961 births
Living people
American jazz pianists
American male pianists
20th-century American pianists
21st-century American pianists
20th-century American male musicians
21st-century American male musicians
American male jazz musicians